Glenn Fitzgerald (born December 21, 1971) is an American actor of stage, film, and television.

Career 
His film roles have included Homicide Detective Anderson in Kathryn Bigelow's Detroit; Lonnie, the son of Alan Alda and Lily Tomlin's characters in Flirting with Disaster; Neil, the boy at the "key party" that goes home with Sigourney Weaver's character in The Ice Storm; the Hasidic scholar husband of Renée Zellweger's character in A Price Above Rubies; the uptight assistant to Sean Connery's character in Gus Van Sant's Finding Forrester; and the earnest antique dealer in M. Night Shyamalan's The Sixth Sense. He has played diverse roles in several independent films, including a terminally ill pacifist forced to fight for his life in Series 7: The Contenders; a sociopathic skinhead opposite Ryan Gosling in The Believer; the sensitive, kind brother in Tully ; and the reckless, drug-addled tank commander opposite Joaquin Phoenix in Buffalo Soldiers.

Between film jobs, Fitzgerald built a stage career, originating roles in Jon Robin Baitz's Mizlansky/Zilinsky, opposite Nathan Lane and directed by Joe Mantello; Kenneth Lonergan's Lobby Hero (Lucille Lortel Award nomination for Outstanding Lead Actor); Will Eno's The Realistic Joneses  with Tracy Letts and Parker Posey, directed by Sam Gold; Melissa James Gibson's THIS at Playwrights Horizons with Julianne Nicholson; David Lindsay-Abaire's Ripcord directed by David Hyde Pierce with Holland Taylor; and Sharr White’s  The True  with Edie Falco at The New Group.

He has appeared in innovative productions of classic plays such as Hedda Gabler at New York Theatre Workshop directed by Ivo van Hove; The Importance of Being Earnest at Williamstown Theatre Festival directed by David Hyde Pierce and starring Tyne Daly; Classic Stage Company's Ivanov and Hamlet directed by Austin Pendleton alongside Ethan Hawke and Peter Sarsgaard and Othello at New York Theatre Workshop directed by Sam Gold.

Television credits includes series regular Brian Darling on ABC's Dirty Sexy Money, and guest starring roles on Six Feet Under, Billions, Madam Secretary, Elementary, Law & Order, Law & Order: Criminal Intent,  Homicide: Life on the Street, CSI: Miami and FBI: Most Wanted .

Filmography

Film

Television

External links 
 
New York Times
New York Times

1971 births
American male film actors
American male stage actors
American male television actors
Male actors from New York (state)
Living people
Place of birth missing (living people)